German submarine U-89 was a Type VIIC U-boat of Nazi Germany's Kriegsmarine during World War II.

She was laid down at the Flender Werke in Lübeck as yard number 293, launched on 20 September 1941 and commissioned on 19 November with Kapitänleutnant Dietrich Lohmann in command.

She was a fairly successful boat, sinking over 13,815 GRT of Allied shipping in a career lasting just one year and five patrols. She was a member of ten wolfpacks. After training with the 8th U-boat Flotilla, U-89 was assigned to the 9th flotilla on 1 May 1942 for operations.

Design
German Type VIIC submarines were preceded by the shorter Type VIIB submarines. U-89 had a displacement of  when at the surface and  while submerged. She had two shafts and two  propellers.

U-89 was fitted with five  torpedo tubes (four fitted at the bow and one at the stern), fourteen torpedoes, one  SK C/35 naval gun, 220 rounds, and a  C/30 anti-aircraft gun. The boat had a complement of between forty-four and sixty.

Service history

First patrol
U-89 departed Kiel for her first patrol on 14 May 1942. She docked in Brest, on the French Atlantic coast, on the 27th.

Second patrol
The boat's second foray started from Brest on 6 June 1942 and finishing there on 21 August. Using her deck gun she sank a Canadian fishing boat, the Lucille M., with 20 incendiary and 15 high explosive rounds off Cape Sable on 25 July

Third patrol
U-89 sank the British ship, the Jeypore on 3 November 1942 and the Daleby also British, both east of Cape Farewell (Greenland), the following day. On the fifth, she was attacked by a B-24 Liberator of No. 120 Squadron RAF. Originally thought to have sunk , U-89 was severely damaged.

Fourth patrol
Sortie number four began from Brest on 24 January 1943; it was relatively uneventful but terminated in La Pallice on 28 March.

Fifth patrol and loss
U-89 left France for the last time on 25 April 1943. On 7 May she sank the Greek Laconikis northeast of the Azores but was herself sunk by a combination of a Fairey Swordfish of 811 Naval Air Squadron from the escort carrier , the destroyer  and the frigate . U-89 was sunk at position .

48 men died with the U-boat; there were no survivors.

Wolfpacks
U-89 took part in ten wolfpacks, namely:
 Endrass (12 – 17 June 1942) 
 Tümmler (4 – 7 October 1942) 
 Panther (10 – 20 October 1942) 
 Veilchen (20 October – 5 November 1942) 
 Pfeil (1 – 9 February 1943) 
 Neptun (20 – 28 February 1943) 
 Wildfang (28 February – 5 March 1943) 
 Burggraf (5 March 1943) 
 Raubgraf (7 – 15 March 1943) 
 Drossel (29 April – 12 May 1943)

Summary of raiding history

References

Bibliography

External links

German Type VIIC submarines
U-boats commissioned in 1941
U-boats sunk in 1943
World War II submarines of Germany
World War II shipwrecks in the Atlantic Ocean
1941 ships
Ships built in Lübeck
U-boats sunk by British aircraft
U-boats sunk by British warships
Ships lost with all hands
Maritime incidents in May 1943